"School for Traitors" is the twentieth episode of the second series of the 1960s cult British spy-fi television series The Avengers, starring Patrick Macnee and Julie Stevens. It was first broadcast in the Teledu Cymru region of the ITV network on Friday 8 February 1963. ABC Weekend TV, who produced the show for ITV, broadcast it the next day in its own regions. The episode was directed by Jonathan Alwyn and written by James Mitchell.

Plot
During a spate of suicides at a university, a burglar seeks a note to Venus. Steed uncovers a sinister plot to blackmail students into espionage activities.

Music
Julie Stevens sings Put On a Happy Face with lyrics by Lee Adams and music by Charles Strouse from Bye Bye Birdie, and Yellow Bird by Alan and Marilyn Bergman

Cast
 Patrick Macnee as John Steed
 Julie Stevens as Venus Smith
 Melissa Stribling as Claire Summers
 Anthony Nicholls as Dr. Shanklin 
 John Standing as Ted East
 Richard Thorp as Jack Roberts
 Reginald Marsh as Higby
 Frank Shelley as Professor Aubyn
 Frederick Farley as One Seven
 Terence Woodfield as Green
 Ronald Mayer as Proctor
 Jane Butlin as Barmaid

References

External links

Episode overview on The Avengers Forever! website

The Avengers (season 2) episodes
1963 British television episodes